Stoyanova is feminine form of a Bulgarian surname Stoyanov.

Boriana Stoyanova (born 1969), Bulgarian artistic gymnast
Elena Stoyanova (born 1952), Bulgarian shot putter 
Krassimira Stoyanova (born 1962), Bulgarian soprano
Mariya Stoyanova (born 1947), Bulgarian basketball player
Penka Stoyanova (born 1950), Bulgarian basketball player
Radka Stoyanova (born 1964), Bulgarian rower

Also
Stojanova, village in Oktyabrsky District, Kursk Oblast, Russia